The Somaliland Regional Games, also known as the SLR Games, is a multi-sport event involving athletes from the Regions of Somaliland. The event was first held in 2011, and has taken place every two or four years since then. The games is under regulation of the Ministry of Youth and Sports (Somaliland) with supervision by the Somaliland Football Association.

See also

 Alamzey Stadium
 Somaliland national football team

References

Multi-sport events